Road 83 is a road in Semnan connecting Shahrood to Azadshahr and  Gonbad-e Qabus. It is the eastern North-South connection which passes the Alborz Mountains.

References

External links 

 Iran road map on Young Journalists Club

Roads in Iran